HMS Enard Bay was a  anti-aircraft frigate of the British Royal Navy, named for Enard Bay in Caithness.

The ship was originally ordered from the Smiths Dock Company of South Bank, Middlesbrough on 25 January 1943 as the  Loch Bracadale, and laid down on 27 May 1944. However the contract was then changed, and the ship was completed to a revised design as a Bay-class anti-aircraft frigate, launched on 31 October 1944, and completed on 4 January 1946.

Service history
After sea trials in December 1945 and January 1946, Enard Bay sailed for the Mediterranean joining the Escort Flotilla at Malta on 7 February. She was first deployed in the eastern Mediterranean for the interception of merchant ships carrying illegal Jewish immigrants to Palestine. In June she returned to Malta, and in August was guard ship at Trieste, returning to the eastern Mediterranean in September for further interception patrols off Haifa. In January 1947 she returned to the UK to decommission and was placed into Plymouth Reserve Fleet, where she was used as an accommodation ship.  In 1953 she took part in the Fleet Review to celebrate the Coronation of Queen Elizabeth II.

Enard Bay was placed on the Disposal List in 1956, and sold to the British Iron & Steel Corporation (BISCO) for demolition by Shipbreaking Industries at Faslane, where she arrived in tow on 15 November 1957.

References

Publications
 

 

1944 ships
Bay-class frigates